Qadian Assembly constituency (Sl. No.: 6), also known as Qadian Assembly constituency, is a Punjab Legislative Assembly constituency covering Qadian in Gurdaspur district, Punjab state, India. VVPAT will be used in Qadian in 2017 Assembly polls.

Members of Legislative Assembly

Election results

2022

2017

2012

2007

References

External links
  

Assembly constituencies of Punjab, India
Gurdaspur district